Jimi Hazel is an American guitarist, who was born in the Bronx, New York City. He gets his name from his guitar idols, Jimi Hendrix and Eddie Hazel. He was childhood friends with Ronny Drayton, who joined the group Hazel founded, 24-7 Spyz. In 2009, Hazel formed a supergroup with Doug Pinnick of King's X, and members of Fishbone. In April 2002, he released a solo album, 21stCenturySouthBronxRockStar.

On working with 24-7 Spyz: "With the first version of the Spyz I have to say on a given night we could give any band a run for their money. I mean the bands we toured with would freak out at how crazy their fans would get when we hit the stage. Some of the bands loved it. The Ramones and Jane's Addiction loved it. PIL, not so much, ha! That first version was like dynamite on stage. The second version of the band was more like a fine wine! HA! Seriously, the second version of the band was my chance to write for a singer who could really sing. Peter was a great frontman but it got to the point where he would rather be doing cartwheels on stage than actually sing! Jeff was a real singer and I got to write better songs for a better band.".

References

American rock guitarists
American male guitarists
Living people
Year of birth missing (living people)